Klisura is a sparsely populated and dispersed, composed of several almost abandoned neighborhoods village in Blagoevgrad Municipality, in Blagoevgrad Province, Bulgaria. It is situated in the Vlahina mountain, bordering with North Macedonia to the west and Kyustendil Province to the north. The area is covered with oak and beech forests. There are remains of prehistorical village nearby.

References

Villages in Blagoevgrad Province